Edwin "EDSA" David Santiago (born June 21, 1957), also known by his initials EDSA, is a Filipino politician and professional mechanical engineer who served as the mayor of City of San Fernando, Pampanga from 2013 until 2022. He previously served as Vice Mayor under Oscar Rodriguez from 2004 until 2013, and Councilor from 1988 until 1998.

Controversies 
On June 19, 2020, former Barangay Dolores chairman Melchor Santos Caluag filed a complaint against Santiago for graft charges for overpriced goods.

Personal life 
Santiago is married to Ma. Luisa Manalansan Baltazar, and they have two children: Pamela and Kristine.

References 

1957 births
Kapampangan people
People from San Fernando, Pampanga
Liberal Party (Philippines) politicians
Mayors of places in Pampanga
Filipino engineers
Mapúa University alumni
People from Pampanga
21st-century Filipino politicians
Living people